Look Saa Nicholas Kengkhetkid Mickelson (Thai : ลูกโซ่ นิโคลัส เก่งเขตกิจ มิคเคลสัน, born 24 July 1999) is a professional footballer who plays as a right back for Danish Superliga club OB. Born in Norway, he played for Norway youth teams up to under-21 level before representing Thailand

Club career
On 30 August 2021 Danish Superliga club OB confirmed, that Mickelson would join the club on 1 January 2022 on a free agent, when his contract with Strømsgodset expired. Mickelson signed a pre-contract until June 2025. However, on 31 August 2021 OB confirmed, that Mickelson would instead join the club with immediate effect.

International career
On 26 May 2022, Mickelson was called up to the Thailand under-23 for the 2022 AFC U-23 Asian Cup.

Career statistics

Club

Notes

Personal life
Mickelson was born in Skien to a Norwegian father and a Thai mother who is Phitsanulok heritage.

References

1999 births
Living people
Norwegian people of Thai descent
Norwegian footballers
Norwegian expatriate footballers
Association football defenders
Norway youth international footballers
Nicholas Mickelson
Nicholas Mickelson
Norway under-21 international footballers
Sportspeople from Skien
Hamarkameratene players
Strømsgodset Toppfotball players
Odense Boldklub players
Norwegian Second Division players
Norwegian First Division players
Eliteserien players
Danish Superliga players
Norwegian expatriate sportspeople in Denmark
Expatriate men's footballers in Denmark